The Xenia Daily Gazette is a Pulitzer Prize-winning American daily newspaper published daily except Sunday in Xenia, Ohio. It is owned by AIM Media based in McAllen, Texas.

It covers the city of Xenia and several nearby communities in Greene County, including Bellbrook, Cedarville, Clifton, Jamestown and Wilberforce.

History
The first edition of the Gazette was a weekly newspaper begun in Xenia in 1868. It converted to daily publication as the Xenia Daily Gazette in November 1881.

In 1975, the staff of the Xenia Daily Gazette won the Pulitzer Prize for Spot News Reporting, in recognition of their coverage of the F5 tornado that decimated Xenia during the 1974 Super Outbreak, killing 34 residents and heavily damaging or destroying about half the buildings in the city. 

More recently, the Xenia Daily Gazette was the flagship newspaper of the Greene County Dailies division of Brown Publishing Company, which also included the Fairborn Daily Herald and the daily (now weekly) Beavercreek News-Current. Brown purchased the Greene County papers from The Thomson Corporation, a Canadian publisher, in 1998.  

Brown, a Cincinnati-based family business, declared bankruptcy and was reconstituted as Ohio Community Media in 2010.  The company, including the Xenia Daily Gazette, was purchased for an undisclosed sum in 2011 by Philadelphia-based Versa Capital Management.

In March 2019, delivery of the print Beavercreek News-Current ceased. The website stopped being updated in April and became inaccessible in May. It appears the Xenia Daily Gazette has suffered the same fate.

References

External links 
 Xenia Daily Gazette website
 Ohio Community Media

Greene County, Ohio
Newspapers published in Ohio
Newspapers established in 1868
Xenia, Ohio
1868 establishments in Ohio
Pulitzer Prize-winning newspapers